Nicole Arendt and Manon Bollegraf won in the final 6–7, 6–3, 6–2 against Alexandra Fusai and Nathalie Tauziat.

Seeds
Champion seeds are indicated in bold text while text in italics indicates the round in which those seeds were eliminated.

 Nicole Arendt /  Manon Bollegraf (champions)
 Patricia Tarabini /  Caroline Vis (quarterfinals)
 Alexandra Fusai /  Nathalie Tauziat (final)
 Naoko Kijimuta /  Nana Miyagi (quarterfinals)

Draw

External links
 1997 U.S. Women's Hard Court Championships Doubles Draw

Women's Doubles
Doubles
Women's sports in Connecticut